James Joseph Long (1870 – 23 December 1932) was an Australian politician. Born at Hamilton-on-Forth, Tasmania, he received a primary education before becoming a miner, and later President of the Federated Mining Enginedrivers' Association. In 1903 he was elected to the Tasmanian House of Assembly as the Labor member for Lyell, transferring to Darwin in 1909. In 1909 he also served as Minister for Lands and Works, Minister for Mines and Minister for Agriculture. In 1910, he left the Assembly and was elected to the Australian Senate as a Labor Senator for Tasmania. He resigned his place in 1918, simultaneously resigning from the Labor Party. He was appointed commissioner enquiring into trade between Australia and the East Indies. After retiring from public life he became a publican in Victoria and finally a businessman in Melbourne. Long died in 1932.

References

Australian Labor Party members of the Parliament of Australia
Members of the Australian Senate for Tasmania
Members of the Australian Senate
Members of the Tasmanian House of Assembly
1870 births
1932 deaths
20th-century Australian politicians